Shitaye is an Ethiopian given name. Notable people with the name include:

Shitaye Alemu, Ethiopian physician and academic
Shitaye Eshete (born 1990), Ethiopian-born Bahraini long-distance runner
Shitaye Gemechu (born 1980), Ethiopian long-distance runner

Ethiopian given names